Moyerella is an extinct genus of bryozoan of the family Arthrostylidae, known from the Upper Ordovician and Lower Silurian periods. Its colonies are branching or segmented, generally articulated (jointed). Its autozooecia are short tubes that appear triangular in cross section within the endozone, bending abruptly when reaching the exozone. The autozooecial apertures are round and aligned into diagonal rows, and paired heterozooecia occur between the autozooecial apertures.

Species

References

Prehistoric bryozoan genera